Yedapalli (Tamil: எடப்பள்ளி) is a Panchayat village in Coonoor Taluk of The Nilgiris District, Tamil Nadu, India.

Geography
Yedapalli is situated about 4.7 km from Sim's Park in Coonoor on the MDR 1073 that leads from Coonoor to Kotagiri.
When traveling from Coonoor towards Kotagiri, the village's bounds begin instantly where the Coonoor Municipality boundary stops.
The village is bounded by
 Bandisholai to the South, the preceding hamlet when driving up from Coonoor.
 Ellithorai to the North, the village succeeding when driving away towards Kotagiri.
 Aracombai to the West, a settlement of SriLankan Tamils in the interior, adjoining the Black-Ridge reserved-forest.
 The south and west of the village limits are bounded by the Black-Ridge reserve-forest.
Yedapalli has two marshes; one lies in a bowl in the rear of the village, and adjoins the Black-Ridge reserve-forest; the other lies alongside the MDR 1073, towards the village boundary in the direction of Coonoor. The entire village sources its water from these two marshes. Restoration of the marshland is underway, under the aegis of Clean-Coonoor, an NGO.
Run-off from the marsh forms a perennial trickle, which flows southwest-wards through the Spring-Field and High-Field tea-estates, picks up strength, flows past Wellington Gymkhana Club's golf-course, and eventually joins the Coonoor river as Ganguathorai.

The village has a bus-stop roughly in the middle of the village.

Vitrag-Group's HillsDale is a gated-community located on the northern end of the village, on the MDR 1073, towards Ellithorai.

Demography
Traditionally a Badaga village, there are a fair number of settlers from outside the community that have made it their home.
As of 2011 census, the total population of the village was 5232, with 53.2% females.
The literacy rate of the village is 80%; the literacy rate amongst women is 35.7%.
Tamil and Badaga are the most common languages. To some extent, Kannada is also spoken. Some people speak a smattering of English; most people will understand English spoken in the Indian accent.
Hindi is not spoken or understood.

Occupation
Tea. The people of Yedapalli primarily produce tea from privately owned holdings populated with tea-bushes.
Crop is carried to neighbouring factories in Bettati, or ForestDale for processing into finished tea. The crop is not picked for quality, but for quantity. Consequently, the product is low-grade tea, known for its strength and colour.

There is no industry in Yedapalli.

General-purpose shops (grocery, green-grocers, a confectioners and tea, hardware, welding-works, and so on) dot the hamlet, mostly strung along the main road.

Famous For
The village is famous for the NGO Yuvaparivarthan, run by the Nikhil Koithara Trust (this is on the main road, at the very beginning of the village bounds when driving up from Coonoor).

The village has also become home to a temple in reverence to Sri Shirdi Sai Baba, and now boasts a multi-theist temple compound, a community hall, a Dharamshala, and a Renal-Care hospital (the only dialysis centre in all of the Nilgiris district). The temple complex will be named Siddha Garhi.

There is also a prayer hall in reverence to Puttaparthi Sai Baba/Sri Sathya Sai, located on the main road, roughly in the middle of the village.

A Vinayagar Temple (a temple in reverence to Lord Ganesha) lies in the centre of the village, on the main road (MDR 1073).

A traditional Badaga temple lies in the interior, in the vicinity of the Sai Temple complex.

Facilities
The village has a Government School on the Tamil Board, and a football ground.

Indian Overseas Bank has a branch in the village - the only bank here. The branch details are:
 Branch Code - 3757
 IFSC Code - IOBA0003757
 Phone number - +91.4266.2498295

A TataIndiCash ATM is available in the village, also located on the main road.

The Pincode of the village is 643104.

Although in the Coonoor Taluk, the STD code for Yedapalli is 04266. (under Kotagiri Telecom Circle)

References

Villages in Nilgiris district